Kendrick Peak  or Kendrick Mountain is one of the highest peaks in the San Francisco volcanic field north of the city of Flagstaff in the U.S. State of Arizona and is located on the Coconino Plateau in Coconino County.

Kendrick Peak is a Lava dome between 2.7 and 1.4 million years old consisting primarily of dacite and rhyolite flows that were partly buried by andesite according to the USGS.

Kendrick Peak is in the Kendrick Mountain Wilderness which is administered jointly by the Kaibab National Forest and the Coconino National Forest. A fire lookout, manned by the United States Forest Service during the week and by volunteers on the weekends, has stood on top of Kendrick Peak since the early 1900s.

There are three maintained trails to the summit of Kendrick Peak - Kendrick Mountain Trail, Pumpkin Trail and Bull Basin Trail.

This is a rare high-elevation example of this species growing amongst Engelmann spruce (Picea engelmannii) and limber pine (Pinus flexilis).

In the year 2000, the Kendrick Wilderness and Kendrick Peak were involved in a large wildfire, the results of which are still quite evident to hikers or visitors to the peak. In an effort to return the forest to its "pre-fire" state, cattle are sometimes grazed near the Kendrick Mountain Trail trailhead.

Geology
Kendrick Peak is a dome volcano, with some having multiple extrusion vents. Other Arizona examples of dome volcanoes are Mount Elden, Bill Williams Mountain, and Sitgreaves Mountain. See List of lava domes for more examples worldwide.

References

External links

 "Kendrick Peak Trail #22." HikeArizona.com
 "Kendrick Wilderness." Wilderness.net.
 "Kendrick Wilderness." Recreation.gov.
 "Kendrick Wilderness." U.S Forest Service.
 

Landforms of Coconino County, Arizona
Mountains of Arizona
Kaibab National Forest
Coconino National Forest
Mountains of Coconino County, Arizona
North American 3000 m summits